Maraşal Fevzi Çakmak is a village in the Çanakkale District of Çanakkale Province in Turkey. Its population is 209 (2021). The village was named after field marshal and politician Fevzi Çakmak.

References

Villages in Çanakkale District